Giancarlo Dametto (born January 6, 1959) is an Italian former volleyball player who competed in the 1980 Summer Olympics and in the 1984 Summer Olympics.

He was born in Turin.

In 1980 he was part of the Italian team which finished ninth in the Olympic tournament. He played all five matches.

Four years later he won the bronze medal with the Italian team in the 1984 Olympic tournament. He played all six matches.

External links
 

1959 births
Living people
Italian men's volleyball players
Olympic volleyball players of Italy
Volleyball players at the 1980 Summer Olympics
Volleyball players at the 1984 Summer Olympics
Olympic bronze medalists for Italy
Sportspeople from Turin
Olympic medalists in volleyball
Medalists at the 1984 Summer Olympics